WITZ-FM (104.7 FM) and WITZ (990 AM) are radio stations broadcasting an adult contemporary music format on FM and a Regional Mexican format on AM. Licensed to Jasper, Indiana, United States, the station is currently owned by Jasper on the Air, Inc. and features programming from Citadel Media and Motor Racing Network.

References

External links

ITZ-FM
Mainstream adult contemporary radio stations in the United States